This article lists the albums attributed to the series Mobile Suit Gundam 00.

Soundtracks

Mobile Suit Gundam 00 Original Soundtrack 01 

 is the first from the anime series Mobile Suit Gundam 00 season one. The entire album was composed by Kenji Kawai.

Mobile Suit Gundam 00 Original Soundtrack 02 

Second soundtrack from the series.

Catalog Number
VTCL-60022

Mobile Suit Gundam 00 Original Soundtrack 03 

Third soundtrack from the series. First press comes with a mini-poster.

Catalog Number
VTCL-60088

Track listing

Mobile Suit Gundam 00 Original Soundtrack 04 

The fourth soundtrack from the series.

Catalog Number
VTCL-60099

Track Listing

Singles

Daybreak's Bell 
Single of Mobile Suit Gundam 00 first season's first opening theme, used from episode 1 to episode 13. The song is also used as the ending theme for episode 25 as well as the ending theme for the last episode of the second season. First press comes with a Gundam 00 sticker and Setsuna F Seiei data card.

Catalog Number
KSCL-1200

Track listing
DAYBREAK'S BELL

DAYBREAK'S BELL(hydeless version)
Natsu no Yūutsu[SEA IN BLOOD 2007] (TETSU P’UNKless version)

Ash Like Snow

Single of Mobile Suit Gundam 00 first season's second opening theme, used from episode 14 to episode 25. Limited Edition includes a bonus DVD containing a music video and making-of footage, a Gundam 00 sticker and Allelujah Haptism data card. First press of the Regular Edition comes with a Gundam 00 sticker and Allelujah Haptism data card.

Catalog Number
DFCL-1438 (Limited Edition)
DFCL-1440 (Regular Edition)

Track listing
Ash Like Snow
goodbye and good luck -Piano Arrange Version-
Ash Like Snow -Original instrumental-

Hakanaku mo Towa no Kanashi
Single of Mobile Suit Gundam 00 second season's first opening theme, used from episode 2 to episode 13. The song is also used as the ending theme for episode 1. Limited Edition includes a bonus DVD featuring footage of some songs from Uverworld's "PROGLUTION TOUR 2008", a Gundam 00 sticker and Setsuna F Seiei data card. Gundam 00 Edition, which is a limited-time issue only available until the end of December 2008, includes Setsuna F Seiei data card, a bonus track ("Hakanaku mo Towa no Kanashi (Anime ver.)"), and comes housed in a deluxe digipak case and illustration of Mobile Suit Gundam. First press of the Regular Edition comes with a Gundam 00 sticker and Setsuna F Seiei data card.

Catalog Number
SRCL-6892 (Limited Edition)
SRCL-6894 (Gundam 00 Edition)
SRCL-6895 (Regular Edition)

Track listing (Gundam 00 Edition)

Hakanaku mo Towa no Kanashi (Anime ver.)

Namida no Mukou

Single of Mobile Suit Gundam 00 second season's second opening theme, used from episode 14 onwards. Gundam 00 Edition, which is a limited-time issue only available until the end of March 2009, includes Allelujah Haptism data card and a bonus track ("Namida no Mukou ~Opening Edition~") and comes housed in a deluxe digipak case. First press of the Regular Edition comes with Allelujah Haptism data card and a wide-cap sticker.

Catalog Number
SRCL-6946 (Regular Edition)
SRCL-6947 (Gundam 00 Edition)

Track listing (Gundam 00 Edition)

Namida no Mukō ~Opening Edition~
Namida no Mukō ~Instrumental~

Wana
Single of Mobile Suit Gundam 00 first season's first ending theme, used from episode 1 to episode 13. Limited Edition has a bonus track, "Serenade Live at NHK HALL in 2007", and comes with Lockon Stratos data card.

Catalog Number
VICL-36361 (Limited Edition)
VICL-36362 (Regular Edition)

Track listing (Limited Edition)

Friends

Single of Mobile Suit Gundam 00 first season's second ending theme, used from episode 14 to episode 24. First press comes with Tieria Erde data card.

Catalog Number
SECL-594

Track listing

LET'S GO!!
because of you (Acoustic ver.)

Prototype

Single of Mobile Suit Gundam 00 second season's first ending theme, used from episode 2 to episode 13. First press comes with Lockon Stratos data card.

Catalog Number
VTCL-35055

Track listing
Prototype
squall
Prototype (without Vocal)
squall (without Vocal)

Trust You

Single of Mobile Suit Gundam 00 second season's second ending theme. Gundam 00 Edition includes Tieria Erde data card and a bonus track ("Trust You -Gundam 00 Version-"). First press of the Regular Edition comes with Tieria Erde data card and a wide-cap sticker.

Catalog Number
SRCL-6972 (Regular Edition)
SRCL-6973 (Gundam 00 Edition)

Track listing (Gundam 00 Edition)
Trust You
Brand New World
Koi wa Groovy×2 -DJ-PASSION MORE PASSION REMIX-
Trust You -Gundam 00 Version-
Trust You -instrumental-

Love Today 

Single of Mobile Suit Gundam 00 first season's insert song, used in episode 19 and 24. It is described as a theme about the love between Saji Crossroad and Louise Halevy.

Catalog Number
VTCL-35023

Track listing
LOVE TODAY

LOVE TODAY (without vocal)
Boku ni ha Dekinai (without vocal)

Tomorrow

Single of Mobile Suit Gundam 00 second season's insert song, sung by Ayumi Tsunematsu as her character Marina Ismail. It was used in episodes 14, 15, 18, 20, 21 and in the ending battle of episode 25 as well as the ending theme for episode 14.

Catalog Number
VTCL-35054

Track listing
TOMORROW
TOMORROW ~Episode 14 Ending Theme~
TOMORROW for BGM ~Piano version
TOMORROW for BGM ~Strings version
TOMORROW (without vocal)
TOMORROW ~Episode 14 Ending Theme~ (without vocal)

Tozasareta Sekai 
Single of ''Mobile Suit Gundam 00 the Movies opening theme.Catalog NumberVIZL-377 (Limited Edition)
VICL-36592 (Regular Edition)Track listing (Limited Edition)
 
 
 

 Qualia 

Single of Mobile Suit Gundam 00 the Movies ending theme.Catalog Number SRCL-7361 - SRCL-7362 (Limited Edition)
 SRCL-7363 (Regular Edition)
 SRCL-7364 (Gundam 00 Edition)Track listing (Limited Edition)
 
 
 UltimateTrack listing''' (Gundam 00 Edition)
 
 
 CHANGE
 Qualia ~for Movie~

 Mō Nani mo Kowakunai, Kowaku wa Nai 
Single of Mobile Suit Gundam 00 the Movies insert song.

Catalog Number
 VTCL-35099

Track listing
 
 TW
 Mō Nani mo Kowakunai, Kowaku wa Nai (without vocal)
 TW (without vocal)

Voice Actor Singles

Mobile Suit Gundam 00 Voice Actor Single 1: Soup/Hakosora

The first character CD, featuring Mamoru Miyano as Setsuna F Seiei. Music is done in collaboration with Skoop On Somebody. First press comes with a collaboration card and housed in a deluxe digipak case.

Catalog Number
VTCL-35030

Track listing
"Soup"

"Soup" (without vocal)
"Hakosora" (without vocal)

Mobile Suit Gundam 00 Voice Actor Single 2: Towa no Rasen/Answer

Second character CD, featuring Shinichiro Miki as Lockon Stratos. Music is done in collaboration with Eijun Suganami and Shinji Matsuda, members of THE BACK HORN. First press comes with a collaboration card and housed in a deluxe digipak case.

Catalog Number
VTCL-35039

Track listing

"Answer"
"Towa no Rasen" (without Vocal)
"Answer" (without Vocal)

Mobile Suit Gundam 00 Voice Actor Single 3: Idea/Elephant

Third character CD, featuring Hiroshi Kamiya as Tieria Erde. Music is done in collaboration with Isamu Teshima, Unicorn's guitarist. First press comes with a collaboration card and housed in a deluxe digipak case.

Catalog Number
VTCL-35042

Track listing
"Idea"
"Elephant"
"Idea" (without Vocal)
"Elephant" (without Vocal)

Mobile Suit Gundam 00 Voice Actor Single 4: Taiyō/After Image

Fourth character CD, featuring Hiroyuki Yoshino as Allelujah Haptism. Music is done in collaboration with Chiaki Ishikawa. First press comes with a collaboration card and housed in a deluxe digipak case.

Catalog Number
VTCL-35041

Track listing

After Image
Taiyō (without Vocal)
After Image (without Vocal)

Mobile Suit Gundam 00 Voice Actor Single 5: Voice (Koko Kara Hajimaru Ai)/Paint the Sky

Fifth character CD, featuring Miyu Irino as Saji Crossroad. Music is done in collaboration with Deen. First press comes with a collaboration card and housed in a deluxe digipak case.

Catalog Number
VTCL-35056

Track listing

Paint the Sky
"Voice (Koko Kara Hajimaru Ai)" (without Vocal)
Paint the Sky (without Vocal)

Mobile Suit Gundam 00 Voice Actor Single 6: Inori/Justice

Sixth character CD, featuring Ayahi Takagaki as Feldt Grace. Music is done in collaboration with Kokia. First press comes with a collaboration card and housed in a deluxe digipak case.

Catalog Number
VTCL-35059

Track listing

"Justice"
"Inori" (without Vocal)
"Justice" (without Vocal)

Mobile Suit Gundam 00 Voice Actor Single 7: Still More Ripple/Utsukushii Hero: Sayōnara no Humour

Seventh character CD, featuring Yuichi Nakamura as Graham Aker. Its soundtrack was composed by Yasunori Mitsuda. First press comes with a collaboration card and housed in a deluxe digipak case.

Catalog Number
VTCL-35059

Track listing
"Still More Ripple"

"Still More Ripple" (without Vocal)
"Utsukushii Hero, Sayōnara no Humour" (without Vocal)

CD Drama Specials

CD Drama Special: Mobile Suit Gundam 00 Another Story MISSION-2306

A prequel drama CD. In this drama CD, Setsuna F Seiei is tasked with the mission of preventing an assassination of Barry Halevy, the leader of a fossil fuel export regulation watchdog group, and protecting his daughter, Louise Halevy from terrorist organizations.
The story itself is a parody, framed as being a Veda simulation undertaken by Setsuna as part of his Gundam Meister training. After forcing an overtly bubbly fake persona, he is forced to call on the other Meisters in turn to help with his mission. This includes Tiera pretending to be a girl, Hallelujah acting as a delinquent and Lockon acting as his older brother. Graham is also featured as a homosexual teacher, with perverted tendencies towards his underage male students.

Catalog Number
VTCL-60063

Track listing
Briefing Room (ブリーフィングルーム　)
Setsuna, Move in (刹那、転入する)
How Do You Do, Tieria (ごきげんよう、ティエリア)
Leader of Hoodlums (不良番長)
Intervention Begins (介入開始)
The Exposed Truth (暴かれた真実)
Goodbye, Mr. Ham (さよなら、ハム先生)
Ending Toll ~ VA's Comments (エンディング・ロール～声優コメント)
CD Drama Extra [Hallelujah's Day] (CDドラマエクストラ「ハレルヤの日」)

CD Drama Special 2: Mobile Suit Gundam 00 Another Story ROAD TO 2307

Second drama CD. This drama CD will focus on the Meisters, as well as the Union's story. Unlike the first prequel CD drama, the second will have a comparatively much more serious tone, with stories that link to the original TV series.

Catalog Number
VTCL-60076

Track listing

Meeting (出会い)
Meisters (マイスターズ)
Tieria's Defiance (ティエリアの挑戦)
Exia VS Virtue (エクシア VS ヴァーチェ)
2 Years Later (2年後)
Graham Maneuver (グラハム・マニューバ)
The Notice from Howard (ハワードからの報せ)
Slature's Motive (スレーチャーの理由)
Mock Battle (模擬戦)
The Sky Waits for You (キミを待つ空)
Ending (エンディング)

References

Mobile Suit Gundam 00 albums
Mobile Suit Gundam 00 albums
Mobile Suit Gundam 00